Jarlsberg was a former countship that forms a part of today's Vestfold county in Norway. 

The former countships of Jarlsberg and Larvik were merged into a county in 1821. Jarlsberg and Larvik's County (Jarlsberg og Larviks amt) were renamed Vestfold in 1919.

Created in 1673 as Griffenfeldt Countship (Griffenfeld grevskap), it was after a few years known as Tønsberg Countship (Tønsberg grevskap) until 1684, when the name became Jarlsberg. Dating to 1681, the countship was associated with members of the Dano-Norwegian noble family, Wedel-Jarlsberg.

House of Griffenfeld
Jarlsberg was originally created as a countship in 1673 for Peder Schumacher Griffenfeld, a Danish statesman and Chancellor of Denmark during the reign of King Christian V of Denmark. Schumacher received in 1671 an armorial grant with name Griffenfeld. The creation involved that Count Griffenfeld, in addition to owning 14 percent of the countship's land, received large tax revenues and also the right to appoint all civil and ecclesiastical officials, including officers and judges, who would serve within the countship. 

 1673-1676 Count Peder Schumacher Griffenfeld

House of Gyldenløve
After Griffenfeld's arrest in 1676, in the aftermath of the Scanian War, his properties and the countship was renamed Tønsberg Countship and were transferred by King Christian V to Ulrik Fredrik Gyldenløve, the Count of Larvik. Gyldenløve, an illegitimate son of King Frederick III of Denmark, was the Viceroy (Statholder) of Norway. 

 1676-1684 Count Ulrik Fredrik Gyldenløve

House of Wedel Jarlsberg

In 1683, Ulrik Fredrik Gyldenløve sold Tøsnberg countship to Gustav Frederik Wilhelm Wedel. Von Wedel was an ancient nobility from Holstein, which received naturalization patent in 1681 as Friherre von Wedel by king Christian V. Field Marshal Wedel, who had become commanding General in Norway in 1681, received the title Lensgreve patent with name Wedel af Jarlsberg in 1684 and introduced the name Jarlsberg, which means ‘Earl’s Hill’.

 1684-1718 Count Gustav Wilhelm von Wedel-Jarlsberg 
 1718–1738 Count Frederik Anton Wedel Jarlsberg
 1738–1776 Count Frederik Christian Otto Wedel Jarlsberg
 1776–1811 Count Frederik Anton II Wedel Jarlsberg
 1811–1840 Count Johan Caspar Herman Wedel Jarlsberg
 1840–1893 Peder Anker Wedel Jarlsberg

See also
Jarlsberg cheese – a type of cheese originates from the region and is named after it
Countship of Larvik - the other countship in Norway

References

Districts of Norway
Norwegian nobility